Liz Camila Giangreco Campiz (born 24 August 1996) is a Paraguayan former professional tennis player.

She won two singles and 20 doubles titles on the ITF Women's Circuit. On 20 November 2017, she reached her best singles ranking of world No. 500. On 1 October 2018, she peaked at No. 403 in the doubles rankings.

Playing for the Paraguay Fed Cup team, Giangreco Campiz has a win–loss record of 4–8; she also represented her country at the 2014 Summer Youth Olympics.

She was coached by Alfredo de Brix. Her last match on the pro circuit took place in November 2018.

Giangreco Campiz is married to fellow tennis player Hugo Dellien.

ITF finals

Singles: 4 (2–2)

Doubles: 25 (20–5)

References

External links

 
 
 

1996 births
Living people
Sportspeople from Asunción
Paraguayan female tennis players
Tennis players at the 2014 Summer Youth Olympics
Tennis players at the 2015 Pan American Games
Pan American Games competitors for Paraguay
South American Games silver medalists for Paraguay
South American Games medalists in tennis
Competitors at the 2018 South American Games
20th-century Paraguayan women
21st-century Paraguayan women